Argila may refer to:

Argila (moth), a genus of moths in the subfamily Lymantriinae
Argila (1940 film), a 1940 Brazilian film
Argila (1969 film), a 1969 West German film
Argila (footballer) (born 1920), Spanish footballer